American country music artist Kip Moore has released four studio albums, two extended plays, twenty-five music videos, and thirteen singles, of which one has charted at number one on Country Airplay: "Somethin' 'Bout a Truck". "Beer Money" would also chart at number one on Canada Country.

Studio albums

Extended plays

Singles

Other charted songs

Music videos

Notes

References

Country music discographies
Discographies of American artists